Denbigh Town Football Club, founded in 1880, is a semi-professional football club based in Denbigh, North Wales. They play in the Ardal Leagues North West, which is in the third tier of the Welsh football league system. The club plays home matches at Central Park.

Club history

Early years
The club was founded in 1880, and in 1924 won both the Welsh Amateur Cup and the North Wales Coast Amateur Cup. During the 1970s, under manager John Trevor Roberts, the club won the Welsh National League (Wrexham Area) Division One Championship four times and the League Cup five times, as well as the 1970 North Wales Coast Amateur Cup and the 1972 North Wales Coast Amateur Cup.

Clwyd League

In the early 1980s Denbigh Town left the Wrexham Area League and joined the Clwyd Football League. The club was promoted to the Premier Division in 1992, under managers Bill Dawson and Roy Cook-Hannah. During the same season the club secured a 1–0 North Wales Challenge Cup victory over Caernarfon Town, then a semi-professional side sitting fourth in the Northern Premier League.

For the 1994–95 season the club won promotion to the Fitlock Welsh Alliance League, finishing fourth in 1995. In the 1995–96 season Denbigh Town won the League Championship and Cookson Cup double.

Cymru Alliance

In the 1996–97 season the club played in the Cymru Alliance. They were relegated in 2001–02 but regained promotion in 2006–07.

Denbigh Town Reserves currently play within the Lock Stock Welsh Alliance Reserve League under Manager Nick Hailes.

Welsh Alliance

Between 2002 and 2007 Denbigh Town played in the Welsh Alliance, reaching the semi final of the 2002–03 Barritt Cup and winning the Alves Cup the same year. On December 8, 2003 manager Roy Cook-Hannah resigned; he was replaced b caretaker coaches Clwyd Williams and Nick Hailes on December 11, 2003. Denbigh finished the 2003–04 season in 12th place with 36 points from 30 matches.

Tim Dyer was appointed manager on May 6, 2004, and in 2005–06 guided the club to the Barritt Cup and Cookson Cup double. Denbigh Town finished the season as runners up in the Welsh Alliance League and winners of the Welsh Alliance Fair Play League, and reached the final of the North Wales Coast FA Challenge Cup.

Return to Cymru Alliance
Denbigh Town were again promoted into the Cymru Alliance on 9 April 2007, when Llanrwst United failed to beat Holywell Town at Halkyn Road.

Denbigh Town also won the 2007 Cookson Cup at Farrar Road to complete a 2006–07 League and Cup double, making Tim Dyer an unusual winner of both League and Cup as a manager and as a player.

In the 2015–16 final the team reached the final of the Welsh League Cup, their first appearance in a major final under manager Gareth (Perry) Thomas. The match was played at Maesdu Park, Llandudno where Denbigh went down to defending Welsh Premier League champions and Welsh League Cup holders The New Saints 2–0. On their way to the final they beat 3 top tier opposition.

In season 2017-18 the Club achieved their highest ever league position by being runners up in the Huws Gray Cymru Alliance under the management of Eddie Maurice-Jones. However at the end of that season Maurice-Jones left the club to take over as manager of close rivals Rhyl FC. Many of the players followed Maurice-Jones to Rhyl FC.

The Club appointed Matthew Jones & Dewi Llion Jones as Joint Managers for season 2018-19. They had to rebuild the squad as all of the previous seasons players left for pastures new. Despite a decent first half of the season the second half of the season saw them drop down the league and on the last day of the season they were relegated to the Lock Stock Welsh Alliance League for season 2019-20.

Dewi Llion Jones was appointed Manager during the close season and Owain Roberts joined him as Assistant Manager.

Back to the Welsh Alliance
At the end of the 2018–19 Cymru Alliance season, the team were relegated back to the Welsh Alliance League for the 2019–20 season. During the 2019-20 season Denbigh reached the Cookson Cup Final but the showpiece was cancelled due to the COVID-19 pandemic. 

Denbigh wouldn't play another game following their Semi-Final win over Nantlle Vale in March 2020 until August 2021 - in a Nathaniel MG Cup loss to Llandudno.

Current squad
As of 11 March 2023

Club staff
 First team manager: Dewi Llion
 First team assistant manager: Kristian Pierce
 First team coach: Matthew Jones
 First team coach: Brett Jones

Honours

 FAW Amateur Trophy
Winners 1923/24

North Wales Coast Amateur Cup
Winners 1924, 1970, 1972

Welsh National League (Wrexham Area) Division One
Champions 1972/73, 1973/74, 1974/75, 1975/76

Clwyd Football League Division One
1991/92 3rd place finish (Promoted)

Clwyd Football League Premier
1993/94 Runners-Up (Promoted)

Welsh Alliance League
Champions 1995/96, 2006/07, 2013/14 (Undefeated)
 Runners-Up 2005/06, 2012/13

Cookson Challenge Cup
Winners 1995/96, 2005/06, 2006/07

Alves Cup
Winners 2002/03, 2005/06, 2006/07

Barrit Cup
Winners 2005/06

North Wales Coast Challenge Cup
Runners-Up 2005/06

Mawddach Cup
Winners 2013/14

Welsh League Cup
Runners-Up 2015/16

Former players
Gary Roberts – Accrington Stanley, Ipswich Town, Huddersfield Town, Swindon Town, Chesterfield and Portsmouth player.

References

External links
Official Denbigh Town FC Site
Denbighshire Free Press
Denbigh Town Weekly Podcast

Football clubs in Wales
Association football clubs established in 1880
Sport in Denbighshire
1880 establishments in Wales
Denbigh
Cymru Alliance clubs
Welsh Alliance League clubs
Ardal Leagues clubs
Welsh League North clubs
Clwyd Football League clubs
North Wales Coast League clubs